The Mid-America version of the NWA United States Tag Team Championship was a professional wrestling tag team championship and promoted by the National Wrestling Alliance (NWA)'s NWA Mid-America territory from 1962 until 1976. The title was intended solely for tag teams in tag team matches, not individuals, and was the secondary tag team championship in NWA Mid-America, with the Mid-America version of the NWA World Tag Team Championship being the primary championship. The promotion also had a third tag team championship at its peak, a testament to the popularity of tag team wrestling in the territory, as they promoted the NWA Mid-America Tag Team Championship as well. The championship was established around March 6, 1962, when Yoshinosato and Taro Sakuro were named champions upon arrival by NWA Mid-America instead of holding a tournament to establish the championship. With a number of NWA territories active at the time this version of the United States Tag Team Championship was one of at least six championships that shared the same name under the NWA's supervision. The team of Dennis Condrey and Phil Hickerson, also known as "The Bicentennial Kings", held the championship the most times, five in total including the last reign when the titles were abandoned in 1976. Because the championship was a professional wrestling championship, it was not won or lost competitively but instead by the decision of the bookers of a wrestling promotion. The championship was awarded after the chosen wrestler "won" a match to maintain the illusion that professional wrestling is a competitive sport.

Title history

Footnotes

See also

List of National Wrestling Alliance championships

References

National Wrestling Alliance championships
NWA Mid-America championships
Tag team wrestling championships
United States professional wrestling championships